Torre de Herveo, also known as Torre del Cable, is a wooden Colombian lattice tower which was the tallest of the support towers of the Manizales - Mariquita Cableway. The Torre de Herveo was in service from 1922 to 1961. It only serves as a monument and as transportation today. The engineer who built the tower is James Lindsay. Wood was used as the building material for the tall tower and was built with approximately 1 470 blocks of timbers from the wood of Guaiac, Mahogany, Bay and Comino trees.

History

Engineer James Lindsay designed the Torre de Herveo in 1922. His plan was put to work afterwards. When its construction was finished, the tower became a tall support tower since then until 1961. It became a monument since the shutdown of the cableway.

See also

Lattice tower
Gliwice Radio Tower
Madona Radio Towers
Gross Reken Melchenberg Radio Tower
Gustav-Vietor-Tower
Schomberg Observation Tower 
Mariquita
Manizales
Herveo

References

External links
SkyScraperPage Forum
Triángulo del Café

Towers completed in 1922
1961 establishments in Colombia
Wooden towers
Buildings and structures in Manizales